Ixora nigricans, or black ixora, is a plant growing up to a height of 5 metres. It is found as common undergrowth in evergreen forests to dry evergreen forests up to 1900 m. Black ixora is found in throughout the forests of the Western Ghats of India .

References

External links

 Details and places where seen

nigricans
Plants described in 1834